Henri Dufaux (18 September 1879, Chens-sur-Léman – 25 December 1980, Geneva) was a 101-year-old Swiss painter.

References
This article was initially translated from the German Wikipedia.

19th-century Swiss painters
Swiss male painters
20th-century Swiss painters
Swiss centenarians
1879 births
1980 deaths
Men centenarians
19th-century Swiss male artists
20th-century Swiss male artists